Ashdod Ad Halom railway station (Hebrew: אשדוד עד הלום) (also known as Ashdod Darom) is a railway station in Ashdod, Israel. It is served by the Binyamina–Tel Aviv–Ashkelon and the Ra'anana–Tel Aviv–Ashkelon–Beersheba suburban lines. Ashdod Ad Halom Station was opened in June 1995 and was fully rebuilt in 2003. Between 1917 and 1947, a small station serving the town of Isdud had also operated at the site, constructed by the British on the Rafah–Gaza–Lydda line.

The station is in the Ad Halom area near the eastern entrance to the city of Ashdod. Two bus lines serve the station, one traveling through the 'city' to the central bus station and on to the terminus at Ashdod Marina.

Until 2013 the travel time from the station to Tel Aviv was 45 minutes. However, since the completion of the new railway through Holon and the new Yavne West Railway Station on 4 August 2013 the travel time from Tel Aviv to the station has been reduced to approximately 35 minutes in each direction. A further reduction in travel time is expected in the future following the planned electrification of the railways serving the station.

The station contains a small beverage and refreshment kiosk.

References

External links

Israel railways web site
On the Platform - information website

Railway stations in Southern District (Israel)
Railway stations opened in 1995
1995 establishments in Israel
Buildings and structures in Ashdod
Ashdod